St. Albert—Edmonton is a federal electoral district in Alberta, Canada, that has been represented in the House of Commons of Canada since 2015.

St. Albert—Edmonton was created by the 2012 federal electoral boundaries redistribution and was legally defined in the 2013 representation order. It came into effect upon the call of the 42nd Canadian federal election, scheduled for October 2015. It was created out of the district of Edmonton—St. Albert.

Members of Parliament

This riding has elected the following members of the House of Commons of Canada:

Election results

References

Alberta federal electoral districts
Politics of Edmonton
Politics of St. Albert, Alberta